Iehiro (written: 家熈 or 家広) is a masculine Japanese given name. Notable people with the name include:

, Japanese court noble
, Japanese writer and translator

Japanese masculine given names